Taroudant Airport  is an airport serving Taroudant, Morocco.

The airport is mainly used for skydiving; the airport has a school to teach skydiving skills and also has a small hangar for the planes used for this sport. The local authorities are planning to invest more in the airport such as paving the current runway to encourage tourism and skydiving in the city.

See also

Transport in Morocco
List of airports in Morocco

References

External links
 OurAirports - Taroudant
 SkyVector - Taroudant
 OpenStreetMap - Taroudant
 Google Earth

Airports in Morocco
Buildings and structures in Souss-Massa